Wolfgang Deml (born July 31, 1945 in Tegernsee, Bavaria) is a German entrepreneur. Since 2011, he's served on the Board of Hauck & Aufhauser KGaA and is a member of the Supervisory Board of the AGCO AG in Atlanta.

Career 
Deml studied industrial engineering at the Ludwig Maximilian University of Munich. He began his career in management consulting at Rosenkrantz and Roland Berger, later, he was Chief Executive Officer at Union Investment. . From 1988 to 2008 he was a member of the board of BayWa AG, since 1991 as CEO Deml was a Vice President of the German - Raiffeisen AG and Chairman of the Austrian-Raiffeisen Landesbanken. He was a contributor member of Lundenburger Invest Beteiligungs AG, Süddeutsche Zuckerrübenverwertungs Cooperative eG to December 2003, MAN Truck & Bus Nutzfahrzeuge AG and Landwirtschaftliche Rentenbank, the Bayerische Landesbank and Raiffeisen Ware Austria Aktiengesellschaft.

Since 1999, he supported the supervisory boards of corporations AGCO, VK mills, Leipnik- Lundenburger Invest Beteiligungs AG, "Our warehouse" Warenhandelsgesellschaft mbH and Mannheimer Versicherung AG. Since 2011 he chairs the Supervisory Board of the Hauck & Aufhauser KGaA and is a member of the Supervisory Board of the AGCO AG in Atlanta. Since 2009 he has been a member of the Advisory Board of Halder Beteiligungsberatung GmbH, which he chairs since 2014.

References

External links
 information about  Agco Corp  with  Executive Profile: Wolfgang Deml  on the website of Bloomberg LP (English).
 Uwe Ritzer:  "A secret system of reimbursement"  In:.  Süddeutsche Zeitung , May 19 of 2010.

German chief executives
1945 births
Living people